USCGC Halibut is a United States Coast Guard Marine Protector-class coastal patrol boat based in Marina del Rey, California.

Like her sister ships, Halibut was built at the Bollinger Shipyards, in Lockport, Louisiana.
Commissioned on April 26, 2002, she replaced the Point-class cutter . She was commissioned on 26 April 2002.

In the early morning of 2 December 2012, Halibut encountered a suspicious vessel and dispatched her pursuit boat to investigate. The crew of the pursuit boat hailed the vessel and attempted to board her for an inspection, upon which the suspicious vessel rammed Halibut′s boat.  Senior Chief Petty Officer Terrell Horne, Halibuts executive petty officer, was credited with heroically pushing a colleague to safety at the cost of his own life.

In October 2016, Halibut joined the Coast Guard patrol boat  in supporting operations by National Oceanic and Atmospheric Administration (NOAA) personnel aboard the Channel Islands National Marine Sanctuary′s research vessel R/V Shearwater who used a VideoRay Mission Specialist remotely operated vehicle to find and identify the wreck of the Coast Guard cutter , which sank in the Pacific Ocean 3 nautical miles (5.5 km) off Point Conception, California, on 13 June 1917 after colliding with the passenger steamer Governor.

References

Ships of the United States Coast Guard
Patrol vessels of the United States
Marine Protector-class coastal patrol boats
Marina del Rey, California
Ships built in Lockport, Louisiana
Maritime incidents in 2012
2001 ships